Alexandru Leșco (born February 21, 1955, Coșernița) is a Moldovan activist, famous for being sentenced by the separatist Transnistrian government for actions which have been described as Moldovan state-sponsored terrorism by Transnistrian government officials. According to European Court of Human Rights, it was an unlawful sentence.

Biography
Alexandru Leșco and the other members of the "Tiraspol Six" were convicted on December 9, 1993, of "terrorist acts". Alexandru Leșco was released only on June 2, 2004.

In July 2005 the European Court of Human Rights ruled that both Moldova and the Russian Federation were responsible for the unlawful detention and torture and ill-treatment suffered by Ilie Ilașcu, Alexandru Leșco, Andrei Ivanțoc, and Tudor Petrov-Popa. His lawyer was Alexandru Tănase.

Alexandru Leșco is a leader of the Democratic Forum of Romanians in Moldova.

Awards
 Order of the Star of Romania, 2000.

References

External links 
 Alexandru Leşco, member of the "Ilaşcu group", released after 12 years of illegal detention
 PROIEC DE LEGE privind declararea domnilor Alexandru Leşco, Andrei Ivanţoc, Tudor Popa drept eroi-martiri
 Hotărârea Curţii Europene a Drepturilor Omului în cazul Ilaşcu şi alţii c. Republica Moldova şi Rusia
 Alexandru Leşco

1955 births
Living people
People from Florești District
Romanian people of Moldovan descent
European Court of Human Rights cases involving Moldova
European Court of Human Rights cases involving Russia
Romanian people convicted of murder
Moldovan people convicted of murder
Moldovan activists
Ilașcu Group
Recipients of the Order of the Republic (Moldova)
Popular Front of Moldova politicians
Politics of Transnistria
History of Transnistria since 1991